The Definitive Collection is a compilation album by American musician Edgar Winter, released on 3 June 2016, and includes tracks from The Edgar Winter Group and Edgar Winter's White Trash days. It is a re-packaging of the 2014 digital-only release The Essential Edgar Winter.

Reception 

Stephen Thomas Erlewine from AllMusic believes The Definitive Collection "surpasses any previous Edgar Winter collection by providing 30 tracks recorded between 1972 and 1981."

PopMatters says "The Definitive Collection takes great efforts to improve on greatest hits packages of yore by putting literally everything in one place, going through his discography in chronological order and cherry-picking hits and quirks along the way, doing what it can to best concise packages".

Track listing

Disc one

Disc two

Release history

References

External links
Edgar Winter – The Definitive Collection at Discogs
Edgar Winter – The Definitive Collection at CD Universe
Edgar Winter – The Essential Edgar Winter at Google Play

Edgar Winter albums
2016 compilation albums
Epic Records compilation albums
Legacy Recordings compilation albums
Albums produced by Rick Derringer